Armudlu is a village in the Kalbajar District of Azerbaijan. The village was occupied by the self-proclaimed Republic of Artsakh during the First Nagorno-Karabakh War, but was returned to Azerbaijan on 25 October 2020 per the 2020 Nagorno-Karabakh ceasefire agreement.

References

External links 

Populated places in Kalbajar District